Ko Jae-Hyo (Hangul: 고재호; born December 3, 1980) is a South Korean footballer (striker) playing currently for PSPS Pekanbaru.

Honours

Club honors
Suwon City
Korea National League (1): 2010
Korea National League Championship (2): 2005, 2007
Korean President's Cup (2): 2004, 2007

References

External links

Ko Jae-Hyo at liga-Indonesia.co.id

1980 births
Association football forwards
South Korean expatriate sportspeople in Indonesia
Expatriate footballers in Indonesia
Liga 1 (Indonesia) players
PSPS Pekanbaru players
Suwon FC players
Korea National League players
Living people
South Korean expatriate footballers
South Korean footballers